Murex concinnus is a species of large predatory sea snail, a marine gastropod mollusk in the family Muricidae, the rock snails or murex snails.

References

External links
 Reeve, L. A. (1845-1849). Monograph of the genus Murex. In: Conchologia Iconica: or, illustrations of the shells of molluscous animals, vol. 3, pls 1-37 and unpaginated text. L. Reeve & Co., London.

Gastropods described in 1845
Murex